Kuramoto may refer to:

Kuramoto (surname)
Kuramoto Station (Tokushima)
Kuramoto Station (Nagano)
Kuramoto model
Kuramoto, Director of the Striders.